Whitefish Mountain Resort is a ski resort in the western United States, located at Big Mountain in northwestern Montana.

History
Winter Sports, Inc. (WSI) formed  in 1947 as a public company of community shareholders, opened Big Mountain that  It hosted the U.S. Alpine Championships in early March 1949, where future Olympic champion Andrea Mead of Vermont won all three women's titles at age sixteen. The mountain originally had a single T-bar, which was replaced by chairlifts installed in 1960, and 1968.

After sixty years, it was renamed "Whitefish Mountain Resort"  by then the ski area had expanded to include ten chairlifts.

Olympic champion Tommy Moe (b.1970) learned to ski and race at the mountain, where his father was on the ski patrol.

The mountain again hosted the U.S. Alpine Championships in 2001.  That event is remembered for the failed comeback attempt, and life-altering crash, of 1984 Olympic downhill champion Bill Johnson.

In May 2004, WSI conducted a 150-for-one reverse stock split. Its stated purpose was to lower expense by reducing the number of shareholders to below the threshold that imposed public reporting requirements. At the time the transaction was proposed, 664 shareholders, or 72% of investors in the company, each separately held less than 150 shares. In total, these investors held a 2.5% equity (and voting) stake. The board expressed concern that the transaction might be viewed as coercive, but after review and outside consultation, decided the transaction was fair to the affected shareholders.

In December 2006, WSI conducted a 15-for-one reverse stock split, further reducing to about 50 remaining shareholders in order to provide a tax advantage as a Subchapter S corporation. Again, all shareholders without enough shares to exchange for a post-split share were required to cash-out their stock. WSI's handling of the reverse split was criticized and resulted in animosity within the local community, where there were objections to the timing of the related announcements and the loss of a community connection to the resort by the 

In early 2008, an avalanche occurred in the Flathead National Forest, within hiking distance of the back side of Big Mountain and killed two skiers on  Later that year, the resort discontinued summer lift access for winter season pass holders, granting several free lift tickets  In September of that same year, the resort reversed the decision and announced that 2008–09 winter season passes would again convey unlimited foot-passenger lift access for

Lifts and runs 
The mountain is separated into three faces. The front side is primarily serviced by the Big Mountain Express high-speed quad out of the Village base area and the Snow Ghost Express high speed six pack from the Base Lodge, and has the most skiable terrain. A second high-speed quad, the Swift Creek Express (formerly the Glacier Chaser), services beginner and intermediate terrain. The front side has seven of the mountain's eleven chairlifts.

The backside of the mountain is serviced by the Big Creek Express, also a high-speed quad. The backside has more tree skiing terrain, and additional terrain can be accessed by the Bigfoot T-Bar on weekends and during select holiday periods, as well as Flower Point (a used triple chairlift acquired from Kimberley Alpine Resort), and East Rim (a triple chairlift relocated from the Glacier View alignment), which services the eastern front side and East Rim.

The western aspect of the mountain contains the Hell Roaring basin. Serviced by Hellroaring (a triple chairlift), Hell Roaring basin is the most advanced skiing on the mountain with cliffs, vertical chutes, and tight tree skiing. The intermediate Hellfire trail is the longest on the mountain; it runs  from the summit to the base of Chair 8. On some days the clouds at Whitefish Mountain Resort are low enough that skiers can literally ski above the clouds.

Lifts
Whitefish currently has 14 operating lifts.
 

References

External links
 
 YouTube - 1949 U.S. Alpine Championships - men's downhill
 Ski Map.org – trail maps – Whitefish Mountain

Buildings and structures in Flathead County, Montana
Ski areas and resorts in Montana
Tourist attractions in Flathead County, Montana